Takua is an Austroasiatic language of Vietnam spoken by the Takua people who live in the mountainous regions of Quảng Nam and Quảng Ngãi provinces.

References

Languages of Vietnam
Bahnaric languages